Gjønavatnet is a lake in Bjørnafjorden Municipality in Vestland county, Norway.  The  lake lies just east of the village of Holdhus and just north of the lake Skogseidvatnet.

See also
List of lakes in Norway

References

Lakes of Vestland
Bjørnafjorden